Nicholas David Beal (born 2 December 1970 in Howden, East Riding of Yorkshire) is a rugby union player who played at Fullback for Northampton Saints, England and the Lions.

Career

Club
Beal spent his whole professional career at Northampton Saints, and captained the squad that won the Middlesex Sevens trophy in 2003. He missed out on their victory in the 2000 Heineken Cup Final due to injury. He retired in 2004.

International
Beal was a part of the England team that won the World Sevens title in 1993. He also joined the 1997 British Lions tour to South Africa.

Personal life
Beal is married with two sons. He attended Royal Grammar School, High Wycombe where he was schoolmates with Northampton and England teammate Matt Dawson.

After retiring he worked as a financial advisor. In 2007 he was appointed a non-executive director of the Saints' board.

References

External links 
Scrum.com player statistics
Sporting heroes profile

1970 births
Living people
British & Irish Lions rugby union players from England
England international rugby sevens players
England international rugby union players
English rugby union players
Male rugby sevens players
Northampton Saints players
People educated at the Royal Grammar School, High Wycombe
People from Howden
Rugby union fullbacks
Rugby union players from Yorkshire